The Burntside River is a river of Minnesota.  The river flows through the west–central portion of Morse Township in northern Saint Louis County.

The river's name comes from the Ojibwe Indians, for nearby areas burned in wildfires.

See also
List of rivers of Minnesota

References

Minnesota Watersheds
USGS Hydrologic Unit Map - State of Minnesota (1974)

Rivers of Minnesota
Rivers of St. Louis County, Minnesota